Christmas in Tattertown is a 1988 animated television Christmas special created and directed by Ralph Bakshi. The special was an unsold pilot episode for a series, Tattertown, about a place where everything discarded in the world came alive. "Christmas in Tattertown" aired on the cable television network Nickelodeon.

Synopsis 
A young girl named Debbie, her doll named Miss Muffet and a stuffed dog are sucked into the realm of Tattertown, where discarded items come to life. While the stuffed dog maintains his loyalty to Debbie, Miss Muffet, who has long felt oppressed by the wear and tear of being a child's plaything, quickly runs off and transforms herself into Muffet the Merciless, set on conquering Tattertown by recruiting Sidney the Spider, an arachnid who attempted to conquer Tattertown before (she first meets him when he's in the middle of kidnapping a cute little raggedy doll in a nearby toy shop, but Muffet thwarts his attempt). Sidney takes Muffet to the "Deadster Zone", located outside of Tattertown and inhabited by the unsavory rejected items (such as war toys and TV sets), where Muffet recruits these inhabitants as goons into her army.

Completely oblivious to Muffet's intentions, Debbie decides to introduce the concept of Christmas to Tattertown, where it is apparently a foreign notion despite some of the items in Tattertown being an old Christmas wreath and an evergreen tree. Tattertown's residents are consistently unable to grasp the concept of Christmas, and in desperation, Debbie plays the original recording of Bing Crosby's "White Christmas" as Muffet attempts an air raid on Tattertown. The raid fails when Muffet's henchmen are distracted by the song, and Muffet lands in jail.

While the residents did consider "White Christmas" to be a beautiful song, it is never resolved whether anyone ever grasped the true meaning of Christmas.

History 
Bakshi originated the idea for Tattertown in high school, where it was originally a comic strip called Junk Town. The strip made light of the human condition by showing the value of things we throw away.

Bakshi worked with Nickelodeon to bring his strip to life as a regular television series, which would have served as Nickelodeon's first original animated series. In 1988, they commissioned him to create a pilot for the series. It aired on December 21, 1988 during the network's Nick at Nite block of programming.

Originally the series was to be picked up in 1989 for 39 episodes, but after a controversy involving an episode from Bakshi's other series Mighty Mouse: The New Adventures, the project was abandoned. Nickelodeon renamed the pilot Christmas in Tattertown and aired it annually as a special until 1992. Bakshi has retained rights to the pilot and in an interview on his official website conducted on August 2, 2007, he confirmed a DVD release, however, no such release has happened. 

In 1995, the special aired in syndication under the title A Tattertown Christmas alongside the Rocko's Modern Life Christmas special "Rocko's Modern Christmas!".

Cast
Charlie Adler - Sidney the Spider / Additional Voices
Keith David - Miles the Saxophone / Additional Voices
Jennifer Darling - Muffet
Sherry Lynn - Debbie
Adrian Arnold - Harvey 
Arthur Burghardt - Additional Voices
Patrick Pinney - Additional Voices
Will Ryan -  Additional Voices (uncredited)

Music Dept
Gary Anderson - Original Music

See also 
 List of programs broadcast by Nickelodeon

References

External links
 

1988 television specials
1980s American television specials
1980s animated television specials
Works by Ralph Bakshi
1980s Nickelodeon original programming
1980s English-language films
Christmas television specials
Television pilots not picked up as a series